Comitas parvifusiformis is a species of sea snail, a marine gastropod mollusc in the family Pseudomelatomidae.

Description

Distribution
This species occurs in the China sea.

References

 Li B.-Q. [Bao-Quan] & Li X.-Z. [Xin-Zheng]. (2008). Report on the two subfamilies Clavatulinae and Cochlespirinae (Mollusca: Neogastropoda: Turridae) from the China seas. Zootaxa. 1771: 31-42
 Liu J.Y. [Ruiyu] (ed.). (2008). Checklist of marine biota of China seas. China Science Press. 1267 pp.

parvifusiformis
Gastropods described in 2008